Jaycee Joming Chan (born 3 December 1982), known professionally as Jaycee Chan, is an American singer and actor. In 2004, he released his first Mandarin CD album in Hong Kong. He later went to Taiwan to continue his music career. He is the son of Hong Kong-born Chinese actor and martial artist Jackie Chan and Taiwanese actress Joan Lin. He sings and performs in Mandarin and Cantonese.

In 2014, Chan was arrested and jailed for the possession and distribution of marijuana, and for accommodating drug users at his apartment in Beijing. Chan was sentenced to six months in state prison, and served out his full sentence behind bars.

Early life and education
Jaycee was born on 3 December 1982 in Los Angeles, California, United States, the son of Taiwanese actress Joan Lin and Hong Kong-born Chinese martial arts star Jackie Chan. Sources, including Jackie Chan's autobiography, state that he was born in 1984 and that his parents were married in 1983. On the other hand, Jackie's official website states that Chan was born in 1982.

Jaycee briefly attended the College of William and Mary in Williamsburg, Virginia, for two semesters, but did not graduate. He has a penchant for luxury cars and nightlife and stated that he left school because "all you can see in Virginia is sheep."

Jaycee speaks English, Mandarin and Cantonese.

Career
Giving up on school, Jaycee moved to Hong Kong in 2003 to pursue his career. He composed the music and wrote the lyrics for 10 of the 13 tracks on his first CD, "Jaycee" (2004). His film debut was The Twins Effect II, in which his father had a cameo role. His second role was a Hong Kong romance film 2 Young, in which he co-starred with Hong Kong Cantopop singer Fiona Sit. They both worked together again on Break Up Club in 2010. In 2007, he co-starred alongside Nicholas Tse and Shawn Yue in Benny Chan's action film Invisible Target.

Despite heavy promotions and awards, his albums and movies have not been commercially successful. His film Double Trouble only grossed  in Hong Kong in the first two weeks.

In early 2009, Chinese websites reported he had given up his United States citizenship in favor of Chinese citizenship to appeal to local audiences. He later confirmed this on Instagram.

He voiced the younger version of his father's character Master Monkey in Secrets of the Furious Five. In addition, he voiced Master Crane in the Cantonese version of Kung Fu Panda and its sequel Kung Fu Panda 2.

Jaycee and his father Jackie starred together in Jackie's 100th film, 1911. The team-up resulted in Jackie Chan's least profitable and worst reviewed film to date.

To appeal to non-Chinese audiences, his studios hired Korean and Singaporean artists Jang Na-ra and Fann Wong to promote Jaycee's new film Whoever. The film was meant to satire Jaycee's life as a playboy from a famous father. Once again, the film was a box office disaster, not placing in the Chinese top ten, despite a government mandate requiring it to be played at half the nation's theaters. The studios decided not to release the film theatrically in Hong Kong and Taiwan.

In 2015, his father revealed that Jaycee had shown interest on writing a script for a sequel to CZ12 and will make the film "if it's right".

Arrest
On 18 August 2014, it was reported that Chan had been arrested on 14 August, by Beijing police due to drug possession, alongside Kai Ko, a Taiwanese actor. Public informants known as Chaoyang masses were credited for turning Chan in. While Ko was set to be released 14 days after his arrest, Chan faced criminal charges and sentences up to the death penalty or life imprisonment for allegedly hosting others to consume marijuana. 

Chan, whose father Jackie had been China's anti-drug goodwill ambassador since 2009, admitted to taking drugs for 8 years. Soon after, Jackie Chan made a public apology for his son's drug use. On 17 September 2014, Beijing Dongcheng procurator's office approved the formal arrest of Chan on suspicion of "accommodating drug users".

Chan spent his 32nd birthday in custody with his mother stating that her son has borrowed more than a hundred books to read since he was detained. On 22 December 2014, four months after his arrest, Chan was indicted by Chinese authorities for sheltering other people to use drugs. His trial finally began on 9 January 2015 in Beijing, after spending 148 days in detention.  Chan was sentenced to six months in prison and fined 2,000 yuan (~US$320). Chan confessed that he broke the law and he should be punished for his actions and that he would not do it again. His parents did not attend their son's hearing, although the elder Chan was reportedly in Beijing. His father repeatedly said that he would not use his connections to lighten his son's sentence.

It was later revealed that during his detention, Chan wrote a three-page remorse letter to his mother in which he promised that he would not repeat his mistakes in the future.

Chan was released from jail on 13 February during midnight hours. One day after his release, Chan held a press conference in Beijing to make a public apology by saying that he had no reason and no excuse for his law breaking and his arrest had a negative impact on society and that it disappointed his supporters while causing losses for those who worked with him. In his four-minute speech, he promised that he would be a law-abiding citizen, and while he still had plans to continue in the entertainment industry, he would focus on spending Chinese New Year with his parents. He stated that prison life was harsh and that his father did not use any connections to help ease his sentence. He extended a deep bow both before and after his speech.

Before his arrest in August 2014, Jaycee was filming Monk Comes Down the Mountain. His role in the film was not credited due to his arrest.

Reception and public image 
Chan is largely viewed as a spendthrift and "playboy" whose movies and music have not been met with commercial or critical success despite heavy promotion and support. In 2014, People's Daily ranked Chan as one of China's top "wastrel" fuerdai. Chan's arrest in 2014 severely affected his career, and he lost multi-million dollar endorsements and contracts from Adidas, Nivea, Yishion, Johnson & Johnson contact lenses, Stride gum, KFC, and Chevrolet.

Personal life
After Chan's release from prison, he lived with his mother in Taipei, keeping a low profile, and often wearing a mask to avoid being seen in public. In 2020, despite his criminal record and having renounced his U.S. citizenship, he returned to Los Angeles. He claimed he had flown before COVID-19 had spread to the United States. When the situation worsened in the US, he decided to stay in LA as he felt that there would be a higher probability of him being infected if he were to make the long journey home.

He has a younger half-sister named Etta Ng, who was born in 1999 due to his father's affair with former Hong Kong beauty queen, Elaine Ng. However, the half siblings are not known to have met.

Relationship with Jackie Chan 
During an awards ceremony in Beijing in April 2011, Jackie stated that he would be donating half his money to charity when he dies, instead of to his son. Jackie explained, "If he is capable, he can make his own money. If he is not, then he will just be wasting my money."

It was reported that Jaycee and his father Jackie Chan have an estranged relationship with each other. After serving six months in jail, Jaycee met his father for the first time in Taiwan, and the two appeared to have reconciled. "I hadn't seen him for too long. I feel he's matured this time," Jackie Chan said. "We didn't talk about unhappy things. It was all family chat. We talked into the night and didn't sleep." Before leaving to do a promotion, he gave his son a haircut.

Filmography

Discography

References

External links
 
 
 
 Jaycee Chan Instagram 
 Jaycee Chan Photostags

1982 births
Living people
2014 controversies
21st-century Hong Kong male actors
21st-century Hong Kong male singers
Alumni of Wah Yan
College of William & Mary alumni
People who renounced United States citizenship
Hong Kong male film actors
Hong Kong male singers
Hong Kong male television actors
Hong Kong male voice actors
Hong Kong Mandopop singers
Hong Kong people of Taiwanese descent
Male actors from Los Angeles
American born Hong Kong artists